Josef Rudnick (25 May 1917 – 14 July 2009) was a German businessman and politician of the Christian Democratic Union of Germany.

Biography
Rudnick was born in Sichts (today Żychce, Kashubia, Poland) in the Prussian Province of West Prussia and grew up in  Deutsch Krone. He was active in catholic Youth organizations and founded a local group of young Catholics in 1935–36, which caused persecution by the Nazi authorities including a house search and an interrogation by the Gestapo.

After World War II Rudnick was expelled from his hometown, which became Polish and worked at the administration of Rheine in 1945–49. In 1950 Rudnick founded a clothing company, which became one of the leading German shirt-producers with about 1500 employees. He also engaged in the political reconstruction and was a founding member of the local CDU of the Kreis Steinfurt and their Youth organisation Junge Union.

Already throughout the 1960s and 70's Rudnick started to approach textile factories in Eastern Europe such as Wolczanka S.A. in Łódź. He was an active supporter of the Catholic Church in Poland and benefited the construction of the Church of the Congregation of the Sisters of Our Lady of Mercy in Łódź. Rudnick organised several transports of humanitarian aid throughout the Martial law in Poland.

Josef Rudnick died on 14 July 2009, four weeks after his wife.

Awards
Rudnick was honored with
 Verdienstorden der Bundesrepublik Deutschland
 Verdienstorden des Landes Nordrhein-Westfalen
 Ludwig-Erhard-Medaille für Verdienste um die Soziale Marktwirtschaft
 Order of Merit of the Republic of Poland
 Honorary citizen of Łódź
 Papal merit medal (2002)

References

1917 births
2009 deaths
People from Chojnice County
People from West Prussia
Businesspeople from North Rhine-Westphalia
Christian Democratic Union of Germany politicians
Members of the Order of Merit of North Rhine-Westphalia
Commanders Crosses of the Order of Merit of the Federal Republic of Germany
People from Wałcz